"Electric Man" is a song by the English alternative rock band Mansun. The song was written by band-leader Paul Draper. It was recorded and produced by Hugh Padgham with co-producer Michael Hunter during sessions for the group's third studio album. The song was released as the second single in 2000 from the group's third album, Little Kix. The single disappointed commercially reaching the modest peak of #23 on the  UK Singles Chart.

The music video for "Electric Man" was directed by Grant Gee.

Draper largely disowned the song along with the majority of Mansun's third album. In the liner-notes to Legacy: The Best of Mansun, Draper remarks that the song was his attempt to 'lighten up' after the insular Six album: 'Where can we go next after Six? I Know! Vaudeville, The 50s, The Beach Boys....Morecambe and Wise?! This track is my homage to Eric and Ernie.'

Track listing

Personnel

Mansun
 Paul Draper – lead vocals, acoustic guitar, keyboards
 Dominic Chad – electric guitar, backing vocals, piano
 Stove King – bass
 Andie Rathbone – drums, percussion

Production
 Hugh Padgham – producer (all tracks except "The Apartment")
 Mike Hunter - producer ("The Apartment" and The Drifters"), co-producer (all tracks except "The Apartment" and The Drifters"), mixing ("The Apartment" and The Drifters")
 Mark 'Spike' Stent – mixing (all tracks except "The Apartment" and The Drifters")
 Paul Oakenfold and Steve Osborne - remix (I Can Only Disappoint U (both mixes))
 Andy Gray (for 140 dB) - programming (I Can Only Disappoint U (both mixes))
 Anton Corbijn – photography
 Alex Hutchinson (at Free Barrabas!) - design

Chart positions

References

2000 singles
2000 songs
Mansun songs
Songs written by Paul Draper (musician)
Song recordings produced by Hugh Padgham
Parlophone singles